The men's 1500 m race of the 2011 World Single Distance Speed Skating Championships was held on 10 March at 15:30 local time.

Results

References

2011 World Single Distance Speed Skating Championships